Willis Ben Bouchey (May 24, 1907 – September 27, 1977) was an American character actor who appeared in almost 150 films and television shows. He was born in Vernon, Michigan, but raised by his mother and stepfather in Washington state. 

Bouchey may be best known for his movie appearances in The Horse Soldiers, The Long Gray Line, Sergeant Rutledge, Two Rode Together, The Man Who Shot Liberty Valance, The Big Heat, Pickup on South Street, No Name on the Bullet, and Suddenly. He also made uncredited appearances in From Here to Eternity, How the West Was Won, Them!, Executive Suite, and A Star is Born, and appears briefly in Frank Capra's cameo-filled comedy Pocketful of Miracles.

Radio
On old-time radio, Bouchey played the title role in Captain Midnight, Charles Williams in Kitty Keene, Inc., Stanley Bartlett in Midstream, and Pa Barton in The Story of Bud Barton. He was also a member of the ensemble cast of Your Parlor Playhouse.

Television
Bouchey projected a sober, dignified demeanor that served him well in character roles. He was a member of Jack Webb's Dragnet stock company, billed variously as "Willis Bouchey", "William Bouchey", "Willis Buchet," or "Bill Bouchey." He appeared as a sheep trader in the title 1958 episode "Cash Robertson" of the NBC children's western series, Buckskin. In 1960 to 1961, he was cast twice in the  ABC sitcom, Harrigan and Son, and four times in the role of Springer in the CBS sitcom, Pete and Gladys. In 1963 Bouchey appeared as Glen Hubbard on the TV western The Virginian in the episode titled "A Distant Fury." 

He guest-starred on CBS's Dennis the Menace and played a judge in 23 episodes of that same network's Perry Mason, "one of the more frequent judges on the bench" in that program. Also on CBS, on Rod Serling's The Twilight Zone, Willis Bouchey appeared as Dr. Samuel Thorne in the episode The Masks, which premiered March 20, 1964.

Also in 1964, he appeared on Petticoat Junction.  He was Dr. John Rhone in the episode "Kate Flat on Her Back".

He also worked again with Perry Mason title star Raymond Burr in an episode of NBC's Ironside. He made guest appearances on The Sheriff of Cochise (1957), Have Gun Will Travel, Crossroads; Richard Diamond, Private Detective; Johnny Ringo, Stoney Burke, Going My Way, The Dakotas, Hazel (5 episodes), The Munsters (2 episodes), McHale's Navy (3 episodes), The Andy Griffith Show,  and Get Smart.

On ABC's Colt .45 television series, Bouchey played Lew Wallace, the governor of New Mexico Territory, in the episode "Amnesty". Wallace offered a pardon to the bandit Billy the Kid, played on Colt .45 by Robert Conrad.

Throughout his career, Bouchey worked in twelve different productions for director John Ford and was one of the more frequently-used members of Ford's stock company. In The Man Who Shot Liberty Valance, he delivered the final line, "Nothing's too good for the man who shot Liberty Valance."

Selected filmography

 Elopement (1951) – Dr. Lucius Brenner (uncredited)
 Return of the Texan (1952) – Isham Gilder (uncredited)
 Deadline - U.S.A. (1952) – Henry (uncredited)
 Anything Can Happen (1952) – Judge Gordon (uncredited)
 Carbine Williams (1952) – Joseph Mitchell (uncredited)
 Belles on Their Toes (1952) – Kendall Williams (uncredited)
 Red Planet Mars (1952) – President
 Washington Story (1952) – Senator (uncredited)
 Don't Bother to Knock (1952) – Joe the Bartender
 Assignment – Paris! (1952) – Biddle, an Editor
 Just for You (1952) – Hank Ross
 Million Dollar Mermaid (1952) – Director
 The I Don't Care Girl (1953) – Keith Theatre Manager (uncredited)
 Destination Gobi (1953) – Capt. Gates (uncredited)
 The President's Lady (1953) – Judge McNairy (uncredited)
 Pickup on South Street (1953) – Zara
 Dangerous Crossing (1953) – Captain Peters
 Gun Belt (1953) – Endicott
 From Here to Eternity (1953) – Army Lieutenant Colonel (uncredited)
 The Affairs of Dobie Gillis (1953) – Dr. Askit – Quiz Master (uncredited)
 The Big Heat (1953) – Lt. Ted Wilks
 Executive Suite (1954) – Detective (uncredited)
 The Battle of Rogue River (1954) – Major Wallach (uncredited)
 Fireman Save My Child (1954) – Mayor
 Them! (1954) – Official at D.C. Meeting (uncredited)
 Suddenly (1954) – Dan Carney
 A Star Is Born (1954) – McBride (uncredited)
 Drum Beat (1954) – Gen. Gilliam
 The Bridges at Toko-Ri (1954) – Capt. Evans
 The Violent Men (1954) – Sheriff Martin Kenner
 The Long Gray Line (1955) – Maj. Thomas
 Battle Cry (1955) – Mr. Forrester
 Big House, U.S.A. (1955) – Robertson Lambert
 The Eternal Sea (1955) – Review Panel Chairman (Admiral Bill) (uncredited)
 I Cover the Underworld (1955) – Warden Lewis J. Johnson
 The McConnell Story (1955) – Newton Bass
 The Spoilers (1955) – Jonathan Struve
 Hell on Frisco Bay (1956) – Police Lt. Paul Neville
 Forever, Darling (1956) – Mr. Oliver Clinton
 Magnificent Roughnecks (1956) – Ernie Biggers
 Johnny Concho (1956) – Sheriff Henderson
 Pillars of the Sky (1956) – Col. Edson Stedlow
 The Wings of Eagles (1957) – Barton
 The Night Runner (1957) – Loren Mayes
 Last of the Badmen (1957) – Marshall Parker
 Mister Cory (1957) – Mr. Vollard
 The Garment Jungle (1957) – Dave Bronson
 Beau James (1957) – Arthur Julian
 The Last Stagecoach West (1957) – George Bryceson
 Zero Hour! (1957) – British Army Doctor
 Darby's Rangers (1958) – Brig. Gen. Truscott
 The Sheepman (1958) – Frank Payton
 The Last Hurrah (1958) – Roger Sugrue
 No Name on the Bullet (1959) – Buck Hastings
 The Horse Soldiers (1959) – Col. Phil Secord
 It Started with a Kiss (1959) – Officer at Airport (voice, uncredited)
 Sergeant Rutledge (1960) – Col. Otis Fosgate
 Five Guns to Tombstone (1960) – George Landon
 Two Rode Together (1961) – Mr. Harry J. Wringle
 You Have to Run Fast (1961) – Col. Maitland
 Pocketful of Miracles (1961) – Newspaper Editor
 Saintly Sinners (1962) – Police Chief Harrihan
 The Man Who Shot Liberty Valance (1962) – Jason Tully – Conductor
 Incident in an Alley (1962) – Police Capt. Tom Brady
 Panic in Year Zero! (1962) – Dr. Powell Strong
 How the West Was Won (1962) – Surgeon (uncredited)
 Cheyenne Autumn (1964) – Colonel at Victory Cave (uncredited)
 Where Love Has Gone (1964) – Judge Murphy
 McHale's Navy Joins the Air Force (1965) – Adm. Doyle
 Follow Me, Boys! (1966) – Judge (uncredited)
 Return of the Gunfighter (1967) – Judge Ellis
 Support Your Local Sheriff! (1969) – Thomas Devery
 The Love God? (1969) – Judge Jeremiah Claypool
 Young Billy Young (1969) – Doc Cushman
 Dirty Dingus Magee (1970) – Ira Teasdale
 Support Your Local Gunfighter (1971) – McLaglen
 Shoot Out'' (1971) – Stationmaster (uncredited)

References

External links

 
 
 
 In Loving Memory Of Willis Bouchey

1907 births
1977 deaths
20th-century American male actors
American male film actors
American male television actors
Male actors from Michigan
Male actors from Washington (state)
Male Western (genre) film actors
Western (genre) television actors